The 10.5 cm SK L/35 (SK - Schnelladekanone (quick-loading cannon) L - Länge (with a 35-caliber long barrel) was a German naval gun developed in the years before World War I that armed a variety of warships of the Imperial German Navy during World War I.  In addition to the Imperial German Navy the 10.5 cm SK L/35 was used by the Royal Netherlands Navy, Ottoman Navy and Spanish Navy.

Naval Use
The 10.5 cm SK L/35 was used as primary or secondary armament aboard Corvettes, Gunboats, Pre-dreadnought battleships, Protected cruisers, Torpedo gunboats and Unprotected cruisers.

Ships armed with the 10.5 cm SK L/35 include:
 Brandenburg-class battleships
 Bussard-class cruisers
 Carola-class corvettes
 Irene-class cruisers
 Koetei-class gunboats
 Peleng-i Deryâ-class torpedo gunboats

Ammunition 
Ammunition was 105 x 656 mm R and of fixed QF type.

The gun was able to fire:
 Armor Piercing
 High Explosive

Weapons of comparable role, performance and era 
10.5 cm SK L/40 naval gun : Successor to the SK L/35
4"/40 caliber gun : American equivalent
Canon de 100 mm Modèle 1891 : French equivalent
Cannon 102/35 Model 1914 : Italian equivalent
QF 4 inch naval gun Mk I – III : British equivalent

References

Notes

External links
 http://www.navweaps.com/Weapons/WNGER_41-35_skc91.php

Naval guns of Germany
105 mm artillery